Lyn(n) or Lynne Hamilton may refer to:

Lynn Hamilton (actress) (born 1930), American actress
Lynn Hamilton (basketball) (born 1962), née Polson, Canadian basketball player
Lynn Hamilton (politician) 
Lyn Hamilton (1944–2009), author
Lynne Hamilton, (born 1953) English-born professional and gospel singer